Shulka (Şülkä) is a rural locality (a khutor) in Itkulovsky 1st Selsoviet, Baymaksky District, Bashkortostan, Russia. The population was 181 as of 2010. There are 3 streets.

Geography 
Shulka is located 49 km northwest of Baymak (the district's administrative centre) by road. Nadezhdinsky is the nearest rural locality.

References 

Rural localities in Baymaksky District